LHB may refer to:

The University of Texas Longhorn Band, a marching band
Linke-Hofmann-Busch, now Alstom Transport Deutschland, a German rail vehicle manufacturer
LHB coach, passenger coaches of Indian Railways
Late Heavy Bombardment, a period in the Solar System's early history
Local health board, of NHS Wales
Luteinizing hormone beta polypeptide, a protein